The Guyver (released in Europe and South America as Mutronics) is a 1991 American tokusatsu superhero film made in conjunction with Shochiku Films, loosely based on the Japanese manga series of the same name by Yoshiki Takaya. The film tells of a young man, Sean Barker, who discovers an alien artifact called "The Unit" which changes Barker into an alien-hybrid super soldier called "The Guyver". Barker learns that a major corporation called "Chronos" is after the Guyver unit and soon discovers that the people behind Chronos are not human after all. The film was met with a mixed reaction from critics and fans. A sequel followed in 1994 called Guyver: Dark Hero.

Plot

Dr. Tetsu Segawa, a researcher for the corporation Chronos, is on the run after having stolen an alien device known as The Guyver unit from Chronos. He is caught by Lisker, the right hand man of the president of Chronos, and his thugs. Lisker transforms into a Zoanoid and he kills Segawa, who was also a Zoanoid. He returns the metal briefcase to Chronos' president, Fulton Balcus, only to discover that it contains an old toaster, Segawa having hid the unit in a pile of trash before he was caught. At a dojo, Max Reed, a CIA agent, notifies Dr. Segawa's daughter, Mizuki, about the incident, while her boyfriend, Sean Barker, struggles to pay attention in class. Sean follows Reed and Mizuki to the crime scene; there, he stumbles upon the Guyver unit stored, and stuffs it in his backpack. On his way home, his scooter breaks down in the middle of a back alley, and a gang corners him. While Sean is being attacked by the gang, the Guyver activates and fuses with him. Sean, in his newly armoured form, dispatches the gang members, but is shocked by his physical appearance, until the armor quickly disappears into two scars on the back of his neck.

The next night, Sean goes to Mizuki's apartment, and discovers his sensei murdered and Mizuki abducted by Lisker's thugs. With the help of Reed, Sean rescues Mizuki, before the trio are chased by Lisker's gang of Zoanoids. They are trapped in an abandoned warehouse, where Lisker's thugs hold Mizuki captive, and Sean once again transforms into the Guyver to battle them. Sean defeats the Zoanoids before squaring off against Lisker. During the battle, Sean executes a headbutt, which temporarily malfunctions the armor's Control Metal. Now knowing his weakness Lisker and the others attempt to attack the Control Metal to beat Sean. During the fight, Sean kills Lisker's girlfriend, Weber, but he mistakenly believes he killed Mizuki as well. The Zoanoids gang up on him, and Lisker rips the Control Metal off his forehead, disintegrating the armor into liquid, and killing Sean in the process.

Mizuki wakes up at the Chronos headquarters, where Balcus shows her a gallery of Zoanoids, before questioning her on how Sean was able to activate the Guyver. Dr. East, the head of genetics research, discovers that the Control Metal is regenerating itself into a new Guyver unit. After seeing Reed being experimented on, Mizuki assaults Balcus and takes the Control Metal, threatening to throw it into a disposal chamber. The Control Metal begins attaching itself to her hand, preventing it from being dropped in the disposal chamber. Striker, one of Lisker’s goons, inadvertently flings the Control Metal off of Mizuki’s hand, and it is accidentally swallowed by Dr. East. Lisker tries to retrieve it, but East begins to frantically spasm, then dies after being cut open from the inside. A newly alive Sean bursts through East’s body, as the Guyver unit is actually able to not just regenerate itself, but its host as well. Sean and Mizuki free Reed from the experimental chamber, and Sean once again battles Lisker and kills, as well as the other Zoanoids. Before the trio proceed to escape, Reed suddenly mutates into a cockroach-esque Zoanoid, but dies due to his system rejecting the new form. Balcus demands Sean hand over the unit, but can not as he as permanently bonded with it. Balcus reveals his true form as the Zoalord and corners Sean, but the Guyver's defensive system activates cannons on his chest, and obliterates Balcus and the laboratory. Sean deactivates the Guyver armor before he and Mizuki leave Chronos headquarters as Reed's former partner Col. Castle and Striker look on.

Cast

Production
Bandai and Hero Communications approached Screaming Mad George to do the effects work for the film based on his work in A Nightmare on Elm Street 4: The Dream Master, George aggreed on the condition he could direct and brought along with him producer Brian Yuzna and fellow effects artists Steve Wang. George and Wang completed the movie’s principal photography in five weeks, beginning in October 1990, shooting on locations in Simi Valley and Los Angeles. The two began directing side by side before splitting up into separate units with Wang responsible for handling the majority of the film’s action scenes. George said of the production:
The animated version of Guyver is a lot more serious and meant for adults. It had a lot of gory violence and adult themes. As we got into script development, we realized that with the budget and schedule we had to shoot the movie, we’d probably be better off making it for a broader audience, like a PG-I3.

Release
The American version of the film, distributed by New Line, cut several scenes to focus more on action than humor. Producer Yuzna expressed confusion at some of the choices.

Reception
Glenn Kenny of Entertainment Weekly said the film features “surprisingly convincing costumes and effects, inspired casting, and energetic direction, [but] what sinks it is its unfortunate adherence to the time-honored direct-to-video clichés: an unearned paycheck for a onetime A-picture star, and a tendency to fall back on lame humor whenever the going gets slow.”

David Johnson of DVD Verdict criticized the film's "ham-fisted over-acting", "ludicrous plot contrivances", and "nauseatingly hokey soundtrack." Johnson called the film "a big, dumb joke" and said: "Despite some good creature effects, the movie crashed and burned and crashed again, weighted down by preposterous acting [and] corny music."

Nathan Shumate of Cold Fusion Video Reviews criticized the film, in particular “the annoying demeanor and lack of personality” of lead actor Jack Armstrong, adding: "If there ever was a movie made for fan appreciation only, this is it, [...] but not everything can be blamed on audience unfamiliarity; there are plenty of elements in this movie that don’t work even by fanboy standards.”

The film generated enough interest for a sequel, Guyver: Dark Hero. Armstrong was replaced by David Hayter in the role of Sean. The film was more well-received critically than its predecessor.

See also
 Iron Man
 RoboCop
 Max Steel

References

External links
 
 
 

1991 films
American science fiction horror films
1990s science fiction horror films
Live-action films based on manga
Films set in Los Angeles
Films shot in Los Angeles
Guyver (franchise)
1990s English-language films
1990s American films